The Hsinbyume Pagoda (also known as Myatheindan Pagoda) is a large pagoda on the northern side of Mingun in Sagaing Region in Myanmar, on the western bank of the Irrawaddy River. The pagoda is painted white and is modelled on the physical description of the Buddhist sacred mountain, Mount Meru.

Construction

The pagoda was built in 1816 by Bagyidaw. It is dedicated to the memory of his first consort and cousin, Princess Hsinbyume (lit. Princess White Elephant, 1789–1812) who had died in childbirth in a site nearby.

Design
The pagoda's design is a great departure from Burmese pagoda design norms. It is based on descriptions of the mythical Sulamani pagoda on Mount Meru, and the lower parts of the pagoda represent the mountain. Seven concentric terraces represent the seven mountain ranges going up to the Mount Meru according to Buddhist mythology.

Restoration
The pagoda was badly damaged by an earthquake in 1838 and was restored by King Mindon in 1874.

See also

Mingun
Mingun Pahtodawgyi
Bagyidaw

References 

Central Myanmar Destinations, Yadana Narawat
The Hsinphyume Pagoda

Buildings and structures in Sagaing Region
Pagodas in Myanmar
19th-century Buddhist temples
Religious buildings and structures completed in 1816